Frank Orth (February 21, 1880 – March 17, 1962) was an American actor born in Philadelphia. He is probably best remembered for his portrayal of Inspector Faraday in the 1951-1953 television series Boston Blackie.

Career
By 1897, Orth was performing in vaudeville with his wife, Ann Codee, in an act called "Codee and Orth". In 1909, he expanded into song writing, with songs such as "The Phone Bell Rang" and "Meet Me on the Boardwalk, Dearie".

His first contact with motion pictures was in 1928, when he was part of the first foreign-language shorts in sound produced by Warner Bros.  He and his wife also appeared together in a series of two-reel comedies in the early 1930s.  Orth's first major screen credit was in Prairie Thunder, a Dick Foran western, in 1937. From then on, he was often cast as bartenders, pharmacists, and grocery clerks, and always distinctly Irish.

He had a recurring role in the Dr. Kildare series of films and also in the Nancy Drew series as the befuddled Officer Tweedy.  Among his better roles were the newspaper man Cary Grant telephones early in His Girl Friday, one of the quartet singing "Gary Owen" in They Died with Their Boots On (thereby giving Errol Flynn as Gen. Custer the idea of associating the tune with the 7th Cavalry), and as the little man carrying the sign reading "The End Is Near" throughout Colonel Effingham's Raid. However, Orth is probably best remembered for his portrayal of Inspector Faraday in the 1951-1953 television series Boston Blackie. A short, plump, round-faced man, often smoking a cigar, Orth as Faraday wore his own dark-rimmed spectacles, though rarely in feature films.

In 1959, Orth retired from show business after throat surgery. His wife died in 1961 after around fifty years of marriage.

Death
Orth died on March 17, 1962. He is buried in Forest Lawn Cemetery in the Hollywood Hills next to his wife.

Selected filmography

The Painter (1931)
Sleepy Head (1931)
Dumb Luck (1931)
The Unwelcome Stranger (1935) - Jackson
The Payoff (1935) - Porter (uncredited)
Two Against the World (1936) - Tommy - Bartender
Hot Money (1936) - Hank Ford
Polo Joe (1936) - Bert
Land Beyond the Law (1937) - Deputy Shorty Long
San Quentin (1937) - Convict in Bunkhouse (uncredited)
Fly-Away Baby (1937) - Newsreel Reporter at Airport (uncredited)
Ever Since Eve (1937) - Cocktail Waiter (uncredited)
Marry the Girl (1937) - Barman (uncredited)
Talent Scout (1937) - Burlesque Theatre Manager (uncredited)
The Devil's Saddle Legion (1937) - Judge Barko
The Footloose Heiress (1937) - Justice Abner Cuttler
Prairie Thunder (1937) - Wichita
Submarine D-1 (1937) - Roseland Waiter (uncredited)
Missing Witnesses (1937) - Gordon (uncredited)
The Patient in Room 18 (1938) - Joe Higgins
Torchy Blane in Panama (1938) - First Leopard (uncredited)
Flight into Nowhere (1938) - Hammond's Associate (uncredited)
Little Miss Thoroughbred (1938) - Justice of the Peace (uncredited)
Mr. Chump (1938) - Sheriff Frank Hinton
Young Dr. Kildare (1938) - Mike Ryan (uncredited)
Nancy Drew, Detective (1938) - Captain Tweedy
Comet Over Broadway (1938) - Cab Driver (uncredited)
Burn 'Em Up O'Connor (1939) - Tim 'Mac' McKelvy
Idiot's Delight (1939) - Benny Zinsser (uncredited)
Fast and Loose (1939) - Detective Hendricks (uncredited)
Nancy Drew... Reporter (1939) - Capt. Tweedy (uncredited)
Within the Law (1939) - Jim Jenks
Society Lawyer (1939) - Man in Outer Law Office (uncredited)
Winner Take All (1939) - Pete - Bettor (uncredited)
Broadway Serenade (1939) - Mr. Fellows
Calling Dr. Kildare (1939) - Mike Sullivan - Hospital Cafe Owner (uncredited)
Tell No Tales (1939) - Vic - Bartender (uncredited)
Young Mr. Lincoln (1939) - Loafer (uncredited)
Stanley and Livingstone (1939) - Newspaperman with Pills (uncredited)
Nancy Drew and the Hidden Staircase (1939) - Captain Tweedy
Thunder Afloat (1939) - Old Sailor in Bilge Area (uncredited)
Dust Be My Destiny (1939) - Wedding Witness on Stage (uncredited)
Fast and Furious (1939) - Captain Joe Burke
At the Circus (1939) - Cook in Diner (uncredited)
The Secret of Dr. Kildare (1939) - Mike Sullivan
His Girl Friday (1940) - Duffy
Dr. Kildare's Strange Case (1940) - Mike Ryan, Sullivan's Hospital Cafe
'Til We Meet Again (1940) - Hong Kong Bartender (uncredited)
The Doctor Takes a Wife (1940) - New York Editor (uncredited)
La Conga Nights (1940) - Dennis O'Brien
Florian (1940) - Detective (uncredited)
Brother Orchid (1940) - Waiter at Fat Dutchy's (uncredited)
Gold Rush Maisie (1940) - Harris
Pier 13 (1940) - Dead Pan Charlie
Boom Town (1940) - Barber
Dr. Kildare Goes Home (1940) - Mike Ryan (uncredited)
The Bride Wore Crutches (1940) - Bartender (uncredited)
Mexican Spitfire Out West (1940) - Window Washer (uncredited)
Gallant Sons (1940) - Newspaper Foreman (uncredited)
Father Is a Prince (1940) - Drugstore Proprietor
Dr. Kildare's Crisis (1940) - Mike Ryan, Cafe Owner
Michael Shayne, Private Detective (1940) - Steve
Let's Make Music (1941) - Mr. Botts
Come Live with Me (1941) - Jerry
The Strawberry Blonde (1941) - Baxter - Livery Stable Owner (uncredited)
Road Show (1941) - Joe - Lion Owner (uncredited)
Ride on Vaquero (1941) - Auctioneer (uncredited)
The People vs. Dr. Kildare (1941) - Mike Ryan
The Great American Broadcast (1941) - Counter Man
Broadway Limited (1941) - Lew, Roundhouse Cafe Owner (uncredited)
Sergeant York (1941) - Drummer (uncredited)
Kisses for Breakfast (1941) - T.C. Barrett, the Hobo (uncredited)
Dr. Kildare's Wedding Day (1941) - Mike Ryan
Navy Blues (1941) - Joe (uncredited)
I Wake Up Screaming (1941) - Cemetery Caretaker
They Died with Their Boots On (1941) - Barfly (uncredited)
Skylark (1941) - Subway Cashier (uncredited)
Unholy Partners (1941) - Shino McGoon (uncredited)
Blue, White and Perfect (1942) - Mr. Toby
Right to the Heart (1942) - Pete
Dr. Kildare's Victory (1942) - Mike Ryan
Roxie Hart (1942) - Idler (uncredited)
Rings on Her Fingers (1942) - Kellogg
To the Shores of Tripoli (1942) - The Barber (uncredited)
My Gal Sal (1942) - McGuiness
Henry and Dizzy (1942) - Joe McGuire
The Magnificent Dope (1942) - Messenger
Little Tokyo, U.S.A. (1942) - Jerry
Footlight Serenade (1942) - Mike the stage doorman
Tales of Manhattan (1942) - Secondhand Clothes Dealer (Rogers sequence)
Orchestra Wives (1942) - Rex Willet
Springtime in the Rockies (1942) - Mr. Bickel (uncredited)
Dr. Gillespie's New Assistant (1942) - Mike Ryan
Over My Dead Body (1942) - Detective
The Meanest Man in the World (1943) - NYC Bartender (uncredited)
Hello, Frisco, Hello (1943) - Lou, Bartender at Sharkey's
The Ox-Bow Incident (1943) - Larry Kinkaid (uncredited)
Coney Island (1943) - Saloon Waiter / Member of quartette, 'Irish' number (uncredited)
Sweet Rosie O'Grady (1943) - Taxi Driver
Buffalo Bill (1944) - Sherman - Shooting Gallery Owner
Roger Touhy, Gangster (1944) - Comic in Theater (uncredited)
Summer Storm (1944) - Cafe Maitre d' at End (uncredited)
Wilson (1944) - Smith (uncredited)
The Impatient Years (1944) - Counterman (uncredited)
Greenwich Village (1944) - Ordway (uncredited)
Tall in the Saddle (1944) - 'Shorty' Davis (uncredited)
Storm Over Lisbon (1944) - Murgatroyd
Carolina Blues (1944) - Cab Driver (uncredited)
The Captain from Köpenick (completed in 1941, released in 1945) - Knoll, the Factory Personnel Manager
Pillow to Post (1945) - Clayfield Taxi Driver
Wonder Man (1945) - Charlie - the Bartender (uncredited)
Tell It to a Star (1945) - Augustus T. Goodman
The Lost Weekend (1945) - Opera Cloak Room Attendant
The Dolly Sisters (1945) - Stage Manager at The Bijou (uncredited)
She Went to the Races (1945) - Bartender Skelly
Doll Face (1945) - Peters
Colonel Effingham's Raid (1946) - Wild Man (uncredited)
The Hoodlum Saint (1946) - Chronicle Editor (uncredited)
Blondie's Lucky Day (1946) - Shaving Kit Salesman (uncredited)
Murder in the Music Hall (1946) - Henderson, the Stage Manager
The Bride Wore Boots (1946) - Judge (uncredited)
The Well-Groomed Bride (1946) - Waiter (uncredited)
The Strange Love of Martha Ivers (1946) - Hotel Clerk
It's Great to Be Young (1946) - Franklin Johnson
Wake Up and Dream (1946) - Milkman (uncredited)
The Show-Off (1946) - Mr. Kopec - Superintendent (uncredited)
Lady in the Lake (1946) - Floyd Greer (uncredited)
Born to Speed (1947) - Breezy Bradley
The Guilt of Janet Ames (1947) - Danny
Heartaches (1947) - Mike Connelly, Vic's Agent
Mother Wore Tights (1947) - Stage Doorman (uncredited)
Gas House Kids in Hollywood (1947) - Police Captain
It Had to Be You (1947) - Train Conductor Brown
The Big Clock (1948) - Burt
Fury at Furnace Creek (1948) - Evans (uncredited)
So This Is New York (1948) - A.J. Gluskoter
The Girl from Manhattan (1948) - Oscar Newsome
Family Honeymoon (1948) - Candy Butcher (uncredited)
Blondie's Secret (1948) - Mr. Philpotts
Make Believe Ballroom (1949) - Pop (uncredited)
Red Light (1949) - Stoner
Bride for Sale (1949) - Police Sergeant (uncredited)
The Great Rupert (1950) - Mr. Frank Dingle
Cheaper by the Dozen (1950) - Higgins (uncredited)
Father of the Bride (1950) - Joe
The Petty Girl (1950) - Moody
Double Dynamite (1951) - Mr. Kofer
Something to Live For (1952) - Waiter (uncredited)
Houdini (1953) - Mr. Hunter
Here Come the Girls (1953) - Mr. Hungerford
Not as a Stranger (1955) - Greenville Patient (uncredited)
Hold That Hypnotist (1957) - Beedle - Man in Library (uncredited)

References

External links

 
 

American male film actors
1880 births
1962 deaths
Burials at Forest Lawn Memorial Park (Hollywood Hills)
Male actors from Philadelphia
Vaudeville performers
20th-century American male actors